Baghestan (also Romanized as Bāghestān; also known as Bāghestān-e Zohān and Zohān) is a village in Zohan Rural District, Zohan District, Zirkuh County, South Khorasan Province, Iran. At the 2006 census, its population was 104, in 30 families.

References 

Populated places in Zirkuh County